The M30 Luftwaffe Drilling ("triple") was a survival weapon issued to Luftwaffe pilots during World War II. It was used by airmen operating in North Africa. The M30 was intended to be used for hunting and self-defense against natural predators.

For maximum versatility the M30 Luftwaffe Drilling featured two side-by-side 12 gauge shotgun barrels on top and a 9.3x74mmR rifle barrel below. The left-hand barrel was left unchoked for shooting slugs and the right barrel was choked for shooting shotshells. They were manufactured by the German firm JP Sauer.

History
The M30 Luftwaffe Drilling ("Drilling" meaning "triplet") was a Drilling-type Combination gun produced by JP Sauer & Sohn, it was the most finely finished and luxurious survival rifle ever issued by a military force. The commercial quality of the M30 Drilling, the fact that its container and accessories were packed without military acceptance proofs, its limited production and high manufacturing costs, led many historians and arms collectors to conclude that the M30 Luftwaffe Drilling was not routinely issued to Luftwaffe pilots. The head of the Luftwaffe, Hermann Göring, was an avid hunter who often hosted guests at his elaborate hunting lodge, the Carinhall. The M30 Luftwaffe Drilling was possibly ordered through the Luftwaffe by Göring, to be used as gifts for visiting dignitaries, Knight's Cross holders, Luftwaffe aces, Wehrmacht generals, Nazi officials other guests who were invited to his hunting lodge. Luftwaffe general and flying ace Adolf Galland recalled that he and several of his squadron mates were gifted the M30 Luftwaffe Drilling during hunting trips with Göring at the Carinhall. 

The M30 Luftwaffe Drilling saw use by the German Luftwaffe in World War II, primarily during the North African campaign, where it was used as a survival weapon by some Luftwaffe aircrews. It was also used for trap shooting, which was an obligatory exercise to sharpen the eyesight and reflexes of Luftwaffe pilots.

Its powerful 9.3x74mmR cartridge, ballistically similar to .375 Flanged Nitro Express, was best suited for sub-Saharan African plains hunting, even though it was mostly used by pilots flying over North Africa, where fauna was far less lethal. Various reasons have been provided for this gratuitous cartridge, one of which being a mistaken assumption that there were big cats in the region where these firearms would be used. Another reason given is Hermann Göring's personal fondness for hunting, especially for luxurious rifles.

The original production model had been marketed to hunters starting in 1930, and the military iteration of the M30 was produced from 1941 to 1942. They were procured outside of normal military channels and so the military versions were made to the same standards of fit and finish as the commercial version, making the M30 extremely expensive.

The M30 was a Normaldrilling ("normal Drilling") or klassischer Drilling ("classic Drilling"), a type of combination gun with two shotgun barrels and one rifle barrel, which became popular with European hunters in the early 20th century. Drillings had existed earlier, but prior to the introduction of affordable and reliable cast steel gun barrels in the late 19th century they were either prohibitively expensive or too heavy and unwieldy to see much use.

The M30 Luftwaffe Drilling was stored in an aluminium chest on board the aircraft, containing the weapon disassembled into barrel assembly and stock, a sling and cleaning kit, 20 rounds of soft-pointed 9.3x74mmR ammunition (which under international law the airman could not fire at an enemy soldier), 20 12-gauge slug shells and 25 12-gauge birdshot shells. Surviving examples are extremely rare, as only around 2,500 were produced.

Design
The weapon has two hammerless shotgun barrels with a single rifle barrel underneath, firing two 12 or 16 gauge shells (16 only seems to have been used on the commercial version) alongside a single 9.3x74mmR rifle round. The M30 has two triggers and a sliding selector directly behind the lever for opening the breech. With the selector in the forward position, the 100m V-notch rear sight is raised and the forward trigger engaged. In this mode, the front trigger fires the rifle barrel while the rear trigger fires the left shotgun barrel, which is choked for Brenneke slugs. Sliding the selector back retracts the rear sight and makes the front trigger fire the right shotgun barrel, which is choked for birdshot. This setup, common for Drilling-type combination guns, allows the weapon to fire three shots without either opening the breech or lowering the weapon from the shoulder.

See also
 M6 Aircrew Survival Weapon
 Marble Game Getter
 TP-82 Cosmonaut survival pistol
 Combination gun
 List of multiple-barrel firearms

References

External links
 Sauer & Sohn M30 Drilling (Brazilian web site, with photos)

 

Combination guns
Survival guns
World War II weapons of Germany
Weapons and ammunition introduced in 1941